Lunch Hour is a 1962 British romantic drama film directed by James Hill and starring Shirley Anne Field, Robert Stephens and Kay Walsh. Based on a one-act play by John Mortimer, it is about a man and a woman who attempt to have an affair during their lunch hour, but are continually interrupted.

Plot
A recently graduated art school designer joins a wallpaper manufacturing company and catches the eye of a married middle manager. They begin a workplace affair during their lunchtime breaks but their attempts to find privacy are continually thwarted.

The man eventually locates a small hotel where he books a room for just one hour, but then feels the need to invent a hugely-complicated tale to tell the hotel manageress about a troubled marriage and a wife travelling down from Scarborough for a heart-to-heart.

The still-suspicious hotel manageress continually interrupts the couple and, as the man slowly tells the story to his would-be lover, she starts to believe the whole fantasy. She sees herself as the stay-at-home wife, ironing the man's shirts and starts to have sympathy with the wife. The couple argue over the woman's imagined life, and as their hour in the hotel is up, the affair between the couple ends and they return separately to their work roles. There, the man appears sullen and unhappy, while the woman smiles quietly to herself as she works.

Cast

Shirley Anne Field as Girl
Robert Stephens as Man
Kay Walsh as Manageress
Hazel Hughes as Auntie
Michael Robbins as Harris
Nigel Davenport as Personnel manager
Neil Culleton as Little boy
Sandra Leo as Little girl
Peter Ashmore as Lecturer
Vi Stevens as Waitress

Stage play
The play debuted on stage in 1961 as part of a triple bill, alongside A Slight Ace by Harold Pinter and The Form by N.F. Simpson. The cast consisted of Emlyn Williams and Wendy Craig with whom Mortimer had an affair and conceived a son. "It was the Sixties and we were all a lot more excitable then," said Mortimer. It is thought Mortimer's affair with Craig during the production of his play The Wrong Side of the Park may have inspired the writing of Lunch Hour. The play was well received.

The play was later adapted for TV in 1972 with Joss Ackland and Pauline Collins.

Production
Maggie Smith was considered for the female lead but the role ended up going to Shirley Ann Field who was given 7% of the profits.

Field said "we did it, as you can guess, on a shoestring...and we all worked on a percentage of what the picture will make. The point is, we all felt that it had something important to say about the rootlessness and confusion that face young people in England today since they literally have no place to go and be alone except on lunch hour. We think it's bigger than it sounds in this kind of explanation".

Shirley Anne Field described it as perhaps "the most enjoyable film I'd ever done" because the cast and crew all worked so closely together.

Filming
The film was shot at Marylebone Studios in London, a church near Baker Street.

DVD release
The film was issued on DVD in 2011 via the BFI Flipside release scheme.

Sight and Sound called it "Cosy rather than cutting but with a strong whiff of cultural change...its zesty exploration of empowering female frustration makes it a thought-provoking addition to the lad-centric catalogue of early 1960s British cinema".

Notes

References

External links

Lunch Hour at Letterbox DVD

1962 films
Films directed by James Hill (British director)
British black-and-white films
1960s English-language films